Amanda Blake (born Beverly Louise Neill, February 21, 1929 – August 16, 1989) was an American actress best known for the role of the red-haired saloon proprietress "Miss Kitty Russell" on the western television series Gunsmoke. Along with her fourth husband, Frank Gilbert, she ran one of the first successful programs for breeding cheetahs in captivity.

Early life
Amanda Blake was born Beverly Louise Neill in Buffalo, New York, the only child of Jesse and Louise (née Puckett) Neill. Her father was a banker.  Blake was a telephone operator and briefly attended Pomona College before she took up acting.

Catherine Moore ″Kate" Barry (1752–1823), one of Amanda's ancestors, was a heroine of the American Revolutionary War. She warned local patriots of Banastre Tarleton's approach, giving them time to group and prepare for the Battle of Cowpens (January 17, 1781), a major American victory that helped pave the way for the British defeat at Yorktown.

Career

In the late 1940s, Blake was signed to Metro-Goldwyn-Mayer as the studio saw her as its next Greer Garson. She appeared in a few Hollywood films, such as the 1952 western Cattle Town and in the starring role of Miss Robin Crusoe, a 1954 adaptation of the Robinson Crusoe adventure. In 1954, she appeared in A Star Is Born.

Blake became best known for her 19-year stint as the saloon-keeper Miss Kitty on the television series Gunsmoke from 1955 to 1974. On February 27, 1974, Blake brought a lion named Kemo on to the Gunsmoke set.

Because of her continuing role on television, Blake rarely had time for films. She did appear on a number of television shows, including a recurring comedy routine on The Red Skelton Show; as a celebrity on Hollywood Squares, Tattletales, and the 1970s revival of Match Game; and comedy appearances on the Dean Martin Celebrity Roast.

In 1957, Blake guest-starred as Betty Lavon-Coate in the episode titled "Coate of Many Colors" on Rod Cameron's crime drama, State Trooper. Later, after a Gunsmoke reunion film, she made two feature-film appearances: in The Boost, a drug-addiction drama starring James Woods and Sean Young, and B.O.R.N, both in 1988.

In 1968, Blake was inducted into the Hall of Great Western Performers at the National Cowboy and Western Heritage Museum in Oklahoma City. She was the third performer inducted, after Tom Mix and Gary Cooper, selected in 1958 and in 1966.

Personal life
Blake married Don Whitman in 1954 and divorced him in 1956. After the divorce from Whitman, she would go to the 'saloon set' of Gunsmoke. Blake felt like it was home to her on the days when she was not needed. She married Jason Seymour Day Jr. in 1964 and divorced him in 1967. Blake married Frank Gilbert in 1967 and divorced him in 1982. She married Mark Edward Spaeth in 1984. Spaeth died in 1985.

Animal welfare
After Gunsmoke, Blake went into semi-retirement at her home in Phoenix and took on few film or television projects. She instead devoted more time to her animals. She had been known for bringing her pet lion, Kemo, onto the Gunsmoke set. Kemo lived in an animal compound at her home, at which she and husband Frank Gilbert ran an experimental breeding program for cheetahs. They were some of the first to breed cheetahs successfully in captivity; they raised seven generations of cheetahs.

Blake joined with others in 1971 to form the Arizona Animal Welfare League, today the oldest and largest "no-kill" animal shelter in the state. In 1985, she helped finance the start-up of the Performing Animal Welfare Society  and devoted a great deal of time and money in support of its efforts, including travels to Africa. Blake reportedly was a one-time board member of the Humane Society of the United States. In 1997, the Amanda Blake Memorial Wildlife Refuge opened at Rancho Seco Park in Herald, California. The refuge provides sanctuary for free-ranging African hoofed wildlife, most of which were originally destined for exotic animal auctions or hunting ranches.

Declining health and death
Blake was a heavy cigarette smoker and had surgery for oral cancer in 1977. She became a supporter of the American Cancer Society and made fundraising appearances throughout the country. In 1984, she was the recipient of the society's annual Courage Award, which was presented to her by then U.S. President Ronald Reagan. 

On August 16, 1989, Blake died of liver failure brought on by viral hepatitis at Mercy General Hospital in Sacramento, California. The popular media later widely reported that Blake's doctor claimed that she had actually died of AIDS. Her close friends have insisted that she was not a drug user or sexually promiscuous, and that she may have acquired the disease from a former husband.

Filmography

References

Citations

Sources

External links

Amanda Blake Gunsmoke.net

1929 births
1989 deaths
Actresses from Buffalo, New York
AIDS-related deaths in California
American film actresses
American television actresses
Western (genre) film actresses
Keepers of animal sanctuaries
20th-century American actresses
Western (genre) television actors
Actresses from Los Angeles
Actresses from Phoenix, Arizona
People from Austin, Texas
Pomona College alumni
20th-century American women